The Hutch-Kinahan feud is an ongoing gangland feud in Ireland between the Hutch and Kinahan crime families. The feud began in 2015, and has since claimed 18 lives.

Notes

References

Organized crime conflicts in Ireland
Organized crime events in Spain
2010s murders in Spain
2015 murders in Europe
2016 murders in Europe
2017 murders in Europe
2010s murders in the Republic of Ireland
Kinahan Organised Crime Group
Hutch Organised Crime Group